ACL may refer to:

Medicine
 Anterior cruciate ligament, a ligament of the knee
 Anterior cruciate ligament injury, a common occurrence among participants of several sports
Anti-cardiolipin antibodies
ATP citrate lyase, aka ATP citrate synthase

Companies and organizations 
 ACL Cables, a cable manufacturing company in Sri Lanka
 Administration for Community Living
 Adult and Community Learning - Education & Training Foundation
 American Classical League
 Arctic Co-operatives Limited
 Asianet Communications Limited
 Association for Computational Linguistics
 Association of Costs Lawyers
 Ateliers et Chantiers de la Loire
 Atlantic Coast Line Railroad
 Atlantic Container Line
 Australian Christian Lobby
 Ateliers de Construction du Livradois, known as Teilhol since 1978

Sports 
 AFC Champions League, an annual Asian club football competition
 Arena Coventry Limited, owner of the Ricoh Arena, Coventry
 American Cornhole League, an organization that promotes the sport of cornhole
 Arizona Complex League, a US-based rookie league in professional baseball

Transportation 
 Cesar Airport, Aguaclara, Colombia (IATA code: ACL)
 Acle railway station, UK (station code: ACL)
 Atlantic Coast Line, Cornwall, England
 Atlantic City Line, New Jersey

Computing 
 Access-control list in computer security a list of permissions for accessing a computer system resource
 ACL (software company), formerly Audit Command Language
 ACL2, theorem prover
 Agent Communications Language or FIPA-ACL
 Asynchronous Connection-oriented Logical transport, Bluetooth protocol

Entertainment 
 Austin City Limits, a television show
 Austin City Limits Music Festival

Other meanings 
 Akar-Bale language, an extinct Great Andamanese language (ISO 639-3 code ACL)
 Christian Liberal Alliance (ACL), a Romanian electoral alliance
 Aircraft landing lights, a type of electric PAR lamp
 Australian Consumer Law

See also

 ACLS (disambiguation)
 CL (disambiguation)
 ACI (disambiguation)
 AC1 (disambiguation)